Claquato Church is a historic Methodist church located off Washington State Route 6 in Claquato, Washington. It is the oldest standing church building in the state of Washington.

History

Construction commenced in 1857 as a Presbyterian house of worship however the chapel was allowed to be consecrated the following year as Methodist with a promise that the church would be open to all denominations. The building was used as a schoolhouse, known locally as the "Claquato Academy", until a new school was built in 1874. When the county seat moved from Claquato to Chehalis in 1874, the church began to lose its congregants though services continued into the 1930s. A small renovation project, for repairs and the need for a new floor, was completed in 1929. The Salvation Army began services that same year. The building held occasional religious services into the late 1930s, and the site became vacant until a restoration was completed in 1953.

The 1953 renovation, overseen by a local American Legion chapter, made no changes to the building but did include restoring the original woodwork, repairing the belfry, hanging new mid-19th century style wallpaper, and refinishing the exterior. In 2006, the crown of thorns on the steeple was restored and the Lewis County Historical Society installed a commemorative plaque, a "Meeker marker", in honor of early non-Native pioneer, Ezra Meeker.

The Claquato Church is owned by the Lewis County Parks commission since 1952 for use as a public facility however faith services are no longer held. The building was added to the National Register of Historic Places in 1973. The church held a 100-year anniversary in 1958 and a 150th anniversary in 2008.

Architecture

The church was built using the first lumber milled by the new sawmill in the town. It features a louvered belfry and crown steeple modeled after mid-nineteenth century New England meeting houses, topped by a crown of thorns. The original bronze bell, as of 2021, still hangs in the steeple; it was manufactured in Boston, Massachusetts. The pews, donated by residents of Boistfort, and the pulpit, built using wood from the original organ, were hand crafted. The building is 600 square feet, measuring 20 x 30 feet.

See also
List of the oldest churches in the United States
List of the oldest buildings in Washington (state)
National Register of Historic Places listings in Lewis County, Washington

References

External links

Methodist churches in Washington (state)
Buildings and structures in Lewis County, Washington
Churches on the National Register of Historic Places in Washington (state)
National Register of Historic Places in Lewis County, Washington